CCGS CG 118 is one of three training vessels of the Canadian Coast Guard and located at the Canadian Coast Guard College in Westmount, Nova Scotia. The ship is based on the 44-foot motor lifeboat, a converted self-righting lifeboat similar to the Waveney-class lifeboat.

See also

External links

Coast Guard Vessels Built or Acquired Since WWII

CG 118
1975 ships
Ships built in Quebec
Ships of the Canadian Coast Guard